The Israeli Futsal League is the premier  futsal league in Israel it is organized by Israel Football Association. The League winner qualify to the UEFA Futsal Cup.

History
A national futsal league was first organized informally in the early 1990s, building upon the success of the Israel national futsal team in the 1989 and 1992 UEFS Futsal Men's Championship. In 1998, a semi-professional league was organized with the IFA, which ran for two seasons, in 1999 and 2000, and was re-organized as a professional league, sponsored by Coca-Cola, which was called "5X5 Coca-Cola League". This league ran for three seasons, two (winter and summer) in 2003 and one in 2004. During this period there was an attempt to organize a Women's Futsal League, which ran for two seasons.. 
In 2006 the league was re-organized, this time under the name "Israeli Futsal League", and with better cooperation with the IFA. Starting from 2004 league champions competed in the UEFA Futsal Cup, with the best achievement coming from Hapoel Ironi Rishon, who qualified for the Elite round in both 2008 and 2009

Former Champions

Israel Futsal State Cup
For a single season, in 2010, the IFA arranged a cup competition for futsal club, which was played after the league was completed, between October and December 2012. The winner of the competition was Yanshufei Agudat Sport Tel Aviv, who have beaten Hapoel Ironi Rishon Lezion (futsal) 8–7 in the final, and completed the double for the season.

References

External links
Uefa.com 
Futsalplanet.com 
Futsal Israel 
Israel Football Association 

 
Futsal in Israel
futsal
Israel
1998 establishments in Israel
Sports leagues established in 1998
Professional sports leagues in Israel